Tuna Altuna (born 30 January 1989, in Istanbul) is a Turkish tennis player.

Altuna has a career high ATP singles ranking of 651 achieved on 9 September 2013. He also has a career high ATP doubles ranking of 355 achieved on 28 December 2015. In February 2016 he entered the doubles main draw of the inaugural ATP Garanti Koza Sofia Open in Sofia, Bulgaria. Alongside Konstantin Kravchuk, they lost in the quarterfinals against Philipp Oswald and Adil Shamasdin.

Playing for Turkey in Davis Cup, Altuna has a W/L record of 1–1.

ATP career finals

Doubles: 1 (1 runner-up)

References

External links
 
 
 

1989 births
Living people
Turkish male tennis players
Sportspeople from Istanbul